Grady Twins Productions is a film and television production company based out of Hollywood, CA and formed in January 2009 by owners Marti Noxon and Dawn Olmstead.  Noxon and Olmstead previously collaborated on Still Life, Point Pleasant, and Prison Break.

Grady Twins has a first look deal at Warner Horizon Television.

The name of the company is a reference to the twin girls of the same name from the Stephen King novel The Shining, and subsequent Stanley Kubrick film.

In 2013, the company had shut down. The company's only project was made for TeenNick, Gigantic, which hit the airwaves. Noxon went on to start Tiny Pyro, while Dawn Olmstead started her independent production company, which eventually joined Universal Cable Productions in 2014.

References

External links
 Grady Twins Productions on IMDb

Television production companies of the United States
Film production companies of the United States
Mass media companies established in 2009